The Port of Everett is a public seaport authority located on Port Gardner Bay in Everett, Washington, United States. Founded in 1918, it operates a small cargo terminal, a public marina, waterfront real estate, and public recreational lands. The Port of Everett is the third-largest container port in the state of Washington, behind Tacoma and Seattle.

History

The Port of Everett was established on July 13, 1918, via a referendum of Everett citizens. The port was formed in hopes of luring a naval shipyard amid a maritime boom caused by World War I, which would end a few months later. The new port instead became a major lumber trader in the 1920s, owing to the dominant industry in Everett at the time. A major shipbuilder, the Everett-Pacific Shipbuilding & Dry Dock Company, operated from 1942 to 1949 as part of the national response to World War II, but did not remain in place after the end of the war. The port later became dependent on importing parts for Boeing's aircraft assembly business in Everett, which also required rebuilding of several terminal facilities.

The port sold  to the U.S. Navy in 1987 for the creation of Naval Station Everett, a military installation that opened in 1991. The Port of Everett acquired the  Kimberly-Clark mill site in 2019 with plans for a redeveloped office park and other uses.

Facilities

The Port of Everett includes both a deep-water commercial seaport and a marina with over 2,300 slips, which is the largest public marina on the United States' West Coast. Ambitious redevelopment began in 2006 to convert the north end of the waterfront into a community of maritime businesses, retail shops and condominiums, beginning with the Port of Everett's Port Gardner Wharf.  In 2006, the seaport received 119 ships and 59 barges, totaling some 192,000 short tons of cargo. The port's renovated South Terminal was opened in April 2021, featuring a set of  cranes and a new dock.

The port also operates a boat launch on 10th Street; it serves a ferry to Jetty Island, an artificial island that was originally constructed in 1895 to help create an easier navigating experience for commercial ships.

Waterfront businesses

The waterfront is also home to the Everett Yacht Club, which was founded in 1907, although it existed in some form as early as 1895.  During summer months, the marina is home to the Waterfront Concert Series, part of a citywide free concert series.  Each September, Tenth Street Park on the waterfront is home to the annual Everett Coho Derby, while each August the marina promenade is gowned in local art during the Fresh Paint Festival of Artists.

References

1918 establishments in Washington (state)
Everett, Washington
Government agencies established in 1918
Everett